Vieillevigne may refer to the following places in France:

 Vieillevigne, Haute-Garonne, a commune in the Haute-Garonne department
 Vieillevigne, Loire-Atlantique, a commune in the Loire-Atlantique department